Amguri (IPA: æmˈgʊərɪ) is a town and municipal area committee in Sivasagar district in the state of Assam, India.

Geography
Amguri is located in the state of Assam, near the border of Nagaland, in north-east India.  It has an average elevation of 74 metres (242 feet). It is situated on the bank of the river Jhanji and famous for its tea gardens and oil fields.

Demographics
At the 2001 census, Amguri had a population of 6944. Males constitute 56% of the population and females 44%, and 11% of the population is under 6 years of age. Amguri has an literacy rate of 75%, higher than the national literacy average of 59.5%. In Amguri, 55% of the male and 45% of the female population are literate.

Transport

Rail 
Amguri falls under the Tinsukia railway division of the Northeast Frontier Railway zone.

Road 
Amguri is connected to the neighbouring towns by the National Highway-2( Mokokchung-Amguri Road) which falls under the renumbered North- South Highway system and the Dhodar Ali Road. A good volume of traffic to and from the neighbouring towns traverse through Amguri on NH-2( Mokokchung-Amguri Road) to the Indian state of Nagaland.

Notable educational institutions 
Auniati Hemchandradev Higher Secondary School (Science and Commerce stream only at 10+2 level)
 Amguri Girls High School
Amguri College
 National Academy(Junior College)
Don Bosco High School
Pengera Girls High School
Jnan Bikash VidyaPith
Arunodoi Academy

Politics
Amguri Town is part of the 103rd Amguri Legislative Assembly. AGP's Prodip Hazarika is the current MLA of this constituency. Amguri is part of the Jorhat (Lok Sabha constituency).

Health
 Amguri town has one CHC.

Notable people
 

Someswar Kakoti, veteran freedom fighter

References

Cities and towns in Sivasagar district
Sivasagar